Jesús Areso Blanco (born 2 July 1999) is a Spanish footballer who plays as a right back for Burgos CF, on loan from CA Osasuna.

Club career

Athletic Bilbao
Born in Cascante, Navarre, Areso joined CA Osasuna's youth setup in 2014, from CD Aluvión. On 7 July 2017, after finishing his formation, he moved to Athletic Bilbao after the club paid his € 450,000 release clause; alleging "abusive behavior", Osasuna chose to break off relations with Athletic after this.

Areso was assigned to Athletic's reserves in Segunda División B, making his senior debut on 2 September 2017 by coming on as a late substitute for Peru Nolaskoain in a 4–0 home routing of Real Unión. Initially a backup to Jon Sillero, he subsequently became a starter from the 2018–19 campaign onwards.

In August 2020, after making the pre-season with the main squad, Areso was demoted to the B-team after refusing to agree to a new deal, and spent the entire season without playing a single minute. He allegedly refused a contract renewal after seeing few chances of playing in the first team, and officially left the club on 26 May 2021.

Osasuna
Immediately after leaving Athletic, Areso returned to Osasuna after signing a five-year contract on 26 May 2021. He made his professional – and La Liga – debut on 26 September, starting in a 3–2 away win over RCD Mallorca.

On 23 August 2022, after featuring rarely, Areso was loaned to Segunda División side Burgos CF for the season.

International career
Areso made his debut for the unofficial Basque Country national team in May 2019, in a 0–0 draw away to Panama for which a small, youthful and inexperienced squad was selected.

Personal life
Areso's older brother Javier is also a footballer. A winger, he began his career with Osasuna neighbors AD San Juan.

References

External links

1998 births
Living people
People from Tudela (comarca)
Spanish footballers
Footballers from Navarre
Association football defenders
La Liga players
Segunda División B players
Bilbao Athletic footballers
CA Osasuna players
Burgos CF footballers
Spain youth international footballers
Basque Country international footballers